The Hawker Hornbill was the last Hawker military aircraft designed under the direction of W. G. Carter. The design was started in 1925 and the first flight took place in July 1925. The Hornbill did not achieve service in the Royal Air Force due to problems in its power plant and radiator. Only one aircraft was built.

Construction
The Hornbill had a mixed material construction, having a steel engine mount and front fuselage covered with duralumin sheet. The rear fuselage was made of wood structure covered with canvas. The wings also were of wood and canvas. The engine was a 698 hp (520 kW) Rolls-Royce Condor IV driving a fine pitch wooden propeller.

Performance
The aircraft was very fast but lacking in stability and control. At 150 mph (241 km/h), steep turns could not be made without applying full rudder. Engine overheating occurred during flight tests. The single centrally mounted radiator was replaced by two radiators mounted in the lower inner wings, but the problem was not fully cured. The small size of the cockpit restricted the movement of the pilot.

Specifications (Hornbill)

See also

References

Hawker Aircraft since 1920 by Francis K Mason - pub Putnam 1961

1920s British fighter aircraft
Hornbill
Single-engined tractor aircraft
Biplanes
Aircraft first flown in 1925